A ceiling  is an overhead interior surface that covers the upper limits of a room. It is not generally considered a structural element, but a finished surface concealing the underside of the roof structure or the floor of a story above. Ceilings can be decorated to taste, and there are many fine examples of frescoes and artwork on ceilings especially in religious buildings. A ceiling can also be the upper limit of a tunnel.

The most common type of ceiling is the dropped ceiling, which is suspended from structural elements above. Panels of drywall are fastened either directly to the ceiling joists or to a few layers of moisture-proof plywood which are then attached to the joists. Pipework or ducts can be run in the gap above the ceiling, and insulation and fireproofing material can be placed here. Alternatively, ceilings may be spray painted instead, leaving the pipework and ducts exposed but painted, and using spray foam.  

A subset of the dropped ceiling is the suspended ceiling, wherein a network of aluminum struts, as opposed to drywall, are attached to the joists, forming a series of rectangular spaces. Individual pieces of cardboard are then placed inside the bottom of those spaces so that the outer side of the cardboard, interspersed with aluminum rails, is seen as the ceiling from below. This makes it relatively easy to repair the pipes and insulation behind the ceiling, since all that is necessary is to lift off the cardboard, rather than digging through the drywall and then replacing it.

Other types of ceiling include the cathedral ceiling, the concave or barrel-shaped ceiling, the stretched ceiling and the coffered ceiling. Coving often links the ceiling to the surrounding walls. Ceilings can play a part in reducing fire hazard, and a system is available for rating the fire resistance of dropped ceilings.

Types

Ceilings are classified according to their appearance or construction. A cathedral ceiling is any tall ceiling area similar to those in a church. A dropped ceiling is one in which the finished surface is constructed anywhere from a few inches or centimeters to several feet or a few meters below the structure above it. This may be done for aesthetic purposes, such as achieving a desirable ceiling height; or practical purposes such as acoustic damping or providing a space for HVAC or piping. An inverse of this would be a raised floor. A concave or barrel-shaped ceiling is curved or rounded upward, usually for visual or acoustical value, while a coffered ceiling is divided into a grid of recessed square or octagonal panels, also called a "lacunar ceiling". A cove ceiling uses a curved plaster transition between wall and ceiling; it is named for cove molding, a molding with a concave curve. A stretched ceiling (or stretch ceiling) uses a number of individual panels using material such as PVC fixed to a perimeter rail.

Elements

Ceilings have frequently been decorated with fresco painting, mosaic tiles and other surface treatments. While hard to execute (at least in place) a decorated ceiling has the advantage that it is largely protected from damage by fingers and dust. In the past, however, this was more than compensated for by the damage from smoke from candles or a fireplace. Many historic buildings have celebrated ceilings.  Perhaps the most famous is the Sistine Chapel ceiling by Michelangelo.

Ceiling height may have psychological impacts.

Fire-resistance rated ceilings
The most common ceiling that contributes to fire-resistance ratings in commercial and residential construction is the dropped ceiling. In the case of a dropped ceiling, the rating is achieved by the entire system, which is both the structure above, from which the ceilings is suspended, which could be a concrete floor or a timber floor, as well as the suspension mechanism and, finally the lowest membrane or dropped ceiling. Between the structure that the dropped ceiling is suspended from and the dropped membrane, such as a T-bar ceiling or a layer of drywall, there is often some room for mechanical and electrical piping, wiring and ducting to run.

An independent ceiling, however, can be constructed such that it has a stand-alone fire-resistance rating. Such systems must be tested without the benefit of being suspended from a slab above in order to prove that the resulting system is capable of holding itself up. This type of ceiling would be installed to protect items above from fire.

Gallery

See also 
 Beam ceiling
 Hammerbeam roof
 Hollow-core slab
 Moulding (decorative)
 Popcorn ceiling
 Scottish Renaissance painted ceilings
 Tin ceiling
 Passive fire protection
 Fire test
 Hy-Rib

References

External links

 
Merriam-Webster ceiling definition